Aethalida rudis is a moth of the family Erebidae. It was described by Francis Walker in 1864. It is found on Sulawesi in Indonesia.

References

Moths described in 1864
Spilosomina
Moths of Indonesia